Jamira Union is a union parishad of Phultala Upazila in the District and Division of Khulna, Bangladesh.

References

Unions of Phultala Upazila
Populated places in Khulna Division
Populated places in Khulna District